Héctor Torres Calderón is a Puerto Rican politician affiliated with the New Progressive Party (PNP). He has been a member of the Puerto Rico House of Representatives since 2005 representing District 12.

Early years and studies

Héctor Torres Calderón in Barrio Unibón in Morovis. He is the youngest of four children. Torres graduated from the Jaime A. Collazo del Río High School in Morovis.

Torres has an Associate degree in Criminal Justice from John Jay College of Criminal Justice in New York City, and a Bachelor's degree in the same field from the American University of Puerto Rico.

Professional career

Torres was a police officer in the Puerto Rico Police Department as a Criminal Investigation Corps agent, and was Director of Security of Doctor's Center Hospital in Manatí.

Political career

Torres ran for the House of Representatives of Puerto Rico at the 2004 general election. After being elected, he presided the Commission of Public Integrity. He was reelected in 2008 and 2012.

Personal life

Torres is married and has three children.

References

External links
Héctor Torres Calderón Official biography
Héctor Torres Calderón Profile on El Nuevo Día

Living people
John Jay College of Criminal Justice alumni
New Progressive Party members of the House of Representatives of Puerto Rico
People from Morovis, Puerto Rico
Puerto Rican police officers
Year of birth missing (living people)